Yuthasak Sasiprapha is a Thai politician and retired military officer. He has been deputy defence minister in Thaksin Shinawatra's government, and president of the National Olympic Committee of Thailand. From August 2011 to January 2012, he was Minister of Defence, and since then he has served as Deputy Prime Minister in the government of Yingluck Shinawatra until 28 October 2012.

Background
General Yuthasak Sasiprapha is son of Lieutenant General Att and Jumroon Sasiprapha. He is married to Khunying Orapan Sasiprapha and has 3 children. General Yuthasak studied secondary class at Saint Gabriel's College and graduated from Chulachomklao Royal Military Academy in 1961. He also studied in Army Command and Staff College Class 48 and National Defence College of Thailand Class 33.

Career
General Yuthasak Sasiprapha served Royal Thai Army until earned title Major General in 1985 for Army Reserve Force Students chief of staff. In 1990 he was promoted as Lieutenant General and General in 1996, when he was director-general for Office of Policy and Planning, Ministry of Defence. He was permanent secretary of Ministry of Defence from 1 October 1996 until retired in 1998.

Entry into politics
General Yuthasak entered in politics by joined Thai Rak Thai Party and was elected as party list MP. In 2001, he was deputy defence minister in Thaksin Shinawatra's government. In general election 2011, he was also elected as party-list MP from Pheu Thai Party. On 9 August 2011, he was appointed Minister of Defence in the government of Yingluck Shinawatra. In a cabinet reshuffle on 18 January 2012, he lost the Defence portfolio, but was made Deputy Prime Minister, charged with overseeing security affairs.

Royal Decorations
 1989 Knight Grand Cordon (Special Class) of the Most Noble Order of the Crown of Thailand
 1993 Knight Grand Cordon (Special Class), of the Most Exalted Order of the White Elephant
 1997 Grand Companion (Third Class, Higher Grade) of the Most Illustrious Order of Chula Chom Klao

References

Yuthasak Sasiprapha
Yuthasak Sasiprapha
Yuthasak Sasiprapha
Yuthasak Sasiprapha
Yuthasak Sasiprapha
Yuthasak Sasiprapha
Yuthasak Sasiprapha
Sasiprapha, Yuthasak
Yuthasak Sasiprapha
Yuthasak Sasiprapha
Yuthasak Sasiprapha
Yuthasak Sasiprapha
Yuthasak Sasiprapha
Sasiprapha, Yuthasak
Yuthasak Sasiprapha
Yuthasak Sasiprapha